Abū ʿAlī Aḥmad b. Muḥammad b. al-Ḥasan al-Marzūqī, best known as Abu Ali al-Marzuqi (died 1030 AD/c. 421 AH), was an Iranian literary critic, grammarian and lexicographer who wrote in Arabic. He was born in Isfahan and studied Sibawayh's famous work on grammar, the al-Kitab, under the noted grammar expert Abu Ali al-Farisi.

References

Year of birth unknown
1030 deaths
10th-century Iranian writers
11th-century Iranian writers
Writers from Isfahan
Iranian Arabic-language writers
Iranian literary critics
Iranian grammarians
Iranian lexicographers